John Richard Rabbit Dugger (January 13, 1923 – February 23, 1988) was an American football player who played three seasons in the National Football League (NFL) with the Detroit Lions and Chicago Bears. He was drafted by the Pittsburgh Steelers in the second round of the 1945 NFL Draft. Dugger played college football at Ohio State University and attended Canton McKinley High School in Canton, Ohio. He was also a member of the Buffalo Bisons of the All-America Football Conference. He was a consensus first-team All-American in 1944.

Dugger also played one year of professional basketball. He played for the Syracuse Nationals in the National Basketball League (NBL) during the 1946–47 season and averaged 1.7 points per game.

References

External links
Just Sports Stats

1923 births
1988 deaths
All-American college football players
American football defensive ends
American football tackles
Basketball players from Pittsburgh
Buffalo Bisons (AAFC) players
Centers (basketball)
Chicago Bears players
Detroit Lions players
Forwards (basketball)
Ohio State Buckeyes football players
Ohio State Buckeyes men's basketball players
Players of American football from Pittsburgh
Syracuse Nationals players